A COVID-19 outbreak in the city of Shanghai, China began on February 28, 2022, and ended on August 7, 2022. The outbreak was caused by the Omicron variant and became the most widespread in Shanghai since the pandemic began two years prior. Authorities responded with mass COVID-19 testing and a strict lockdown of the city in an effort to uphold China's zero-COVID policy; the latter marked the largest one in the country since the lockdown of Hubei in early 2020. The outbreak caused substantial economic and social disruption across Shanghai with consequences felt elsewhere, and led to the spread of COVID-19 to other parts of China, including Beijing, Guangdong, and Hunan.

Background 

The COVID-19 pandemic is an ongoing viral pandemic of coronavirus disease 2019. It began in early 2020 as an outbreak in Hubei province, China, which prompted a strict lockdown. The Chinese government's response since then has been to pursue a zero-COVID strategy, aiming to eliminate the virus altogether. However, the increased transmissibility of the SARS-CoV-2 Omicron variant that emerged in late 2021 has posed challenges.

Since 2020, nearly 40% of international arrivals to China came through Shanghai. Shanghai also has a relatively large number of imported cases. By March 14, the number of cases reported as coming from outside mainland China was 4345, compared to 473 local cases. Shanghai authorities had previously taken a "more relaxed" approach to the pandemic compared to other Chinese cities. Doctor Zhang Wenhong of the Shanghai Medical Treatment Expert Group, said the control of COVID-19 in Shanghai is like "catching a mouse in the ceramic shop", and said maintaining a normal manufacturing industry and public life is important. Due to the Omicron variant, Shanghai's COVID-19 response had been challenged.

Outbreak 
On February 28, a 56-year-old vaccinated woman came to Tongji Hospital with a fever and was confirmed positive on March 1. This case became patient zero in the outbreak. After confirmation of her case, her dance group had at least 8 people test positive as well. Because of this case, the risk levels of some areas of Shanghai were raised from "low risk" to "middle risk". According to Shanghai's information office, the main source for the spread of the outbreak was the Huating Hotel, where travelers from abroad were quarantined. In response, the Shanghai World Expo Exhibition & Convention Center was converted into a temporary hospital, opening March 26, 2022, and temporary quarantine centers in the Shanghai New International Expo Center opened .

By March 27, 2022, just before Shanghai started area-separated testing, a total of 16,013 people had tested positive for COVID-19. By April 8, 2022, there had been a total of 131,524 people tested positive, with a single severe case. About 90 percent of the cases were "asymptomatic".

By April 17, according to China National Radio, Shanghai had 16 severe cases, all having other health issues, with only 1 of them being vaccinated. On the same day, officials reported 3 deaths of COVID-19 infected patients, with all deaths also being linked to other underlying health conditions, such as diabetes. On April 18, officials reported 7 more deaths with ages ranging from 60 to 101; 6 of them were aged above 70.

On April 22, officials announced they would escalate COVID lockdown restrictions and further tighten lockdown measures. Some of the new measures include evacuating people to disinfect their homes and placing electronic door alarms to warn if infected people are trying to leave.

By April 30, officially all of the deaths were caused by other severe symptoms. In the same day, first mobile cabin hospital(Fangcang hospital) in Shanghai is closed. There is 203 medical workers in this hospital.

Graphs 

Data source: National Health Commission of China

Government response to the outbreak

On March 22, two people posted information on a group chat saying Shanghai was about to perform a "city closure" (Chinese: 封城). The next day, the public security bureau of Shanghai investigated both for the crime of posting false information intentionally. On March 26, Wu Fan, the vice-principal of Shanghai Medical College stated that Shanghai would not go into lockdown because of how much the city contributed to the economy of China.

Mass testing 

On March 4, Shanghai planned to carry out COVID testing of the entire city. In every building with a positive COVID-19 case, all residents were required to undertake "nucleic acid" COVID testing individually. Other areas undertook pooled COVID-19 testing.

On March 26, Shanghai will do COVID testing for people in all three areas. People who did not go to  testing will have their Health Code turned yellow. The health code (健康码) is a colored QR code indicating recent testing and contact status, with each locality developing and controlling their own.

Lockdown 
On 14 March 2022, introduction of travel restrictions was announced by the Shanghai Municipal People's Government and negative PCR testing within 48 hours of the travel became mandatory. In addition to the negative PCR testing, travel from "control area" to "prevention area" was conditioned by the14 days mandatory quarantine at its own residence (quarantine in commercial facilities such as hotel does not qualify) within the "prevention area". On 15 March, Civil Aviation Administration of China announced that the international flights into Shanghai shall be diverted to other cities.

Shanghai decided to adopt "area-separated and batch-separated control" (Chinese: 分区分批防控) starting on March 28. On March 27, many markets got crowded, with some scholars arguing these conditions were due to city closure. This was extended on April 1. Some media suspected that cases were underreported. Wang Keyu, a staff member at Huashan Hospital stated that (locally-available) COVID-19 vaccines offered weak protection against the Omicron variant, and that a wide range of COVID-19 testing control was important and necessary. By March 29, over 9.1 million people had been tested by roughly 17,000 testers in roughly 6,300 testing areas. By April 1, over 18 million people had been tested.

Since April 1, most areas of Shanghai are under three-level control. The levels includes "closed area", "control area", and "prevention area" and typically spans the size of a residential complex, later (in June) granulizing into individual buildings.

On April 5, the lockdown was expanded to encompass the entire city, affecting the population of 25 million. On April 11, Shanghai published the list of closed areas, control areas, and prevention areas.  On April 11, Shanghai officially announced all areas are under three-level control and clarified. Closed area contains people who tested positive for COVID-19 in the neighborhood, the "7-7" quarantine policy is required to follow, during 7-day closing period, if there was no people who tested positive, the restriction will be the same as the restrictions of a "control area". People in control areas can, with limit, collect essential supplies within the neighborhood. Neighborhoods which are listed as prevention areas have no reported case within 14 days. People in prevention areas should only travel within the street.  In practice, additional restrictions are levied by the local residents' committee.

Since April 22, Shanghai officials said Shanghai have to follow the "static management" policy
On April 27, Shanghai officials announced that some hospitals in Shanghai will temporarily suspend their service.

On May 6, multiple areas (including "prevention areas") was put into a so-called "silent period", banning all entry and exit, including delivery shipment. The stated rationale was that some positive cases appeared in prevention areas, and for a "final assault" on the case count. On May 17, another wave of "silencing" started, this time spanning the entirety of multiple districts, again under the name of a "final assault".

On May 6, In Shanghai, which is entering its second month of lockdown, city officials said cases have been declining since Apr 22 and its outbreak is under control.

From May 29, plans were announced to ease the lockdown on June 1. The adjustment entails:
 People entering public areas and taking public transport must now show a negative PCR test result taken with 72 hours. The original requirement was 48 hours.  The standard for leaving the city remains unchanged: negative PCR test taken within 48 hours must be shown along with a negative antigen test within 24 hours.
 A ban on residents' committees adding additional restrictions in all areas except those marked "closed", "control", "mid-risk", and "high-risk". This has attracted criticism from these committees, who claimed that their extra restrictions were not their own decisions, but unwritten telephone orders from above.
 Lockdown measures on businesses are to be lifted as an effort to help the economy that has been hit hard with strict restrictions.

The adjustments were made to "promote epidemic prevention and control as well as economic and social development, and resume work and a return to normal life," the city official added in the May 29 press conference. City officials also emphasized that the term "lifting the lockdown" is not to be used, as "static management" is not "lockdown".

The lockdown was lifted at midnight June 1, with many rushing to the grocery store to restock on food. Shanghai declared that it would do its best to recover the losses caused by the epidemic.

On June 3, four neighborhoods in Jing'an and Pudong were put back into "closed" lockdown and designated as "mid-risk" due to seven new cases found the prior day. On June 7, some more areas are restricted to "closed" area.

In early July, many cases reported is related to a person who visited illegally operated KTV.

Education 
As the caseload in the outbreak was growing, there were messages like "Shanghai will stop school" on Weibo. On March 8, a Shanghai official denied the possibility, but for students absent due to COVID-19 the platform "Air Class" would allow for education to continue. On March 12, in-person school was suspended, with students able to participate using platforms such as "Shanghai V-Class" or "Shanghai Education" instead. On May 7, Official announced the National College Entrance Examination in Shanghai will be extended to June, Senior High School Entrance Examination in Shanghai will extend to July, with lab and English speaking test section being removed and counted as full credit toward final score.

Shanghai Ministry of Education stated all middle and high school student could come to school before June 14.

Transportation 
On April 13, the Public Security Bureau of Shanghai announced that people in prevention areas must not enter "closing areas" and non-essential automobiles would also be prohibited.

Law enforcement 
In general, Mainland China has strict laws controlling crime related to pandemic management. According to Chinese jurist Luo Xiang's Criminal Law Textbook, people who don't obey basic isolation rules when they know they have tested positive for COVID-19 have committed the crime of harming public safety (Chinese: 以危险方法危害公共安全罪). Other people who don't obey isolation rules but caused heavy losses may get accused of the crime of distraction of disease prevention (Chinese: 妨碍传染病防治罪). People who post allegedly false content about COVID-19 control policies may be accused of the crime of posting false information (Chinese: 编造、故意传播虚假信息罪).

On April 18, the Public Security Bureau of Shanghai posted that the message "The women who gave preterm birth failed to ask for help and died because of hemorrhage" was false information. The women gave natural birth and were sent to a hospital on time and successfully gave birth. The publisher Zhang had been captured.

There have been cases of fraud and illegal marketing during the Shanghai lockdown.
On April 16, Ling, the legal representative of a medical company, sold 29,000 masks that did not meet health standards, and was arrested.
On April 19, Tong sold rotten pork and was received 320,000 yuan out of that. Policies have been investing this case.

Quarantine centres 
By mid-April 2022, Shanghai authorities began turning schools, exhibition centres, and some residential buildings into quarantine centres as designated facilities began running short on space.

Impacts 
The outbreak and the strict response had significant economic impacts. Oil prices fell globally. By mid-April, the lockdown had led to Shanghai residents complaining of food shortages.

On April 12, the United States announced they required all non-essential workers at the Shanghai consulate to leave.

During late March, Zhang Wenhong, a doctor who made many speeches during the pandemic, has been absent for a few events, some media suspect that this is a "sign" made by Shanghai government.

Popular culture depictions
After the outbreak, artist Wang Yuanchao created the Shanghainese-language song "Steamed Eggs with Clams", which described how people in Shanghai work together to prevent the spread of COVID-19. The song got considerable attention on the internet upon its publication. On March 27, the song "First Snap Up Groceries, Then Do Nucleic Acid" was published on the WeChat Public Account; it got over 100,000 views in the first ten minutes after being published. Afterwards, the three authors renamed the song to "Buy Groceries" and uploaded it to NetEase Cloud Music, where it received more than 200,000 views. The song uses with humorous Shanghainese lyrics.

A gala celebrating the Covid response was planned on April 12 but got cancelled after public outcry.

An April 22 montage called The Sounds of April featured clips of government announcers and events such as pet-killing, child separation, and medical delays. The author also included some positive events like people sharing foods with in area and stated it was meant to be neutral. Many posts, including the original one, containing the montage were quickly taken down and netizens attempted to fight its removal on WeChat by various edits. Some users even tried to change their username on platforms like Weibo to protest. The original video had been played more than 5 million times before it was taken down.

In late April to early May, online personality Dawn Wong produced Fake News with Alison Alison, an English-language, Chinese-subtitled satirical news show about lockdown conditions, from her residence in Shanghai. She posted two episodes to Weibo and YouTube, both being censored on the former. She was arrested on May 11 shortly after posting the second episode and was released after a two-hour "talk" resulting in the unlisting of these videos from YouTube.

Online protests 
Some content saw takedown by the authorities.
 A rap song titled New Slave was uploaded to YouTube and saw some dissemination on WeChat timelines.
 A clip of the "Do You Hear the People Sing?" sequence from the 2012 film version of the musical Les Misérables circulated on Chinese social medias in protest of the lockdown.
 On April 28, some Shanghai residents self-organized an at-home protest on WeChat. They went to their balconies at night and banged pots in demand of food. The authorities quickly took the organizing posts  down and claimed involvement of "foreign influences".
 On May 11, a group of epidemic prevention workers in white hazmat suits forced a citizen who was claimed to be a close contact to go to a quarantine facility due to CCP's Zero-COVID policy. The citizen told them that they had no right to force him to go to a quarantine facility because it was against the law. After one of the epidemic prevention workers labelled "police" on his suit threatened him that he would receive punishment all the way to his 3rd generation, the citizen responded, "We are the last generation, thank you!"A report from China Digital Times pointed out that this video was forwarded widespread online and commented on by netizens, expressing remonstrance towards the three-child policy. The original video was taken down on the same day.

Controversies

Non-COVID medical delay and deaths 
The lockdown has caused a number of deaths due to an inability to receive appropriate medical care as COVID testing is required to access any emergency services and any hospital that has seen to a positive patient needed to undergo disinfection. High-profile individuals who died include a former Fudan University professor Yu Huizhong, a Dongfang Hospital nurse Zhou Shengni, and violinist Chun Shunping. On April 14, an article on WeChat listed 12 deaths due to lockdown practices, but was deleted soon after. A crowd-sourced continuation of the effort on Airtable listed 186 deaths as of April 30.

Shanghai violinist Chen Shunping experienced a severe stomach ache and vomiting at night on April 13. Upon calling emergency services, he was told he would have to "wait in line". Later that night, he went to two different hospitals and was unable to receive medical service at either. Faced with immense pain, he committed suicide by jumping off a building.

A 58-year-old male was found dead at home on May 1, with rumors of death by starvation. The city fact-checking service interviewed paramedics and confirmed that the actual cause was cardiac arrest. The community also said that they took good care of the man prior to his death, knowing that he was not in good health, having regularly delivered food during the pandemic.

Suicides 
On March 26, an old man is seen having died after falling off a residential building. The original poster suggested that the death was due to lack of access to medical help, but the family clarified that the dead has been allowed to regularly go to the hospital to the government-run fact checker.

On April 3, a Shanghai woman wanted to send her grandfather meals, but the distance between their homes was very far. She found a man to deliver the meals for her to Qingpu but did not ask for money. The next day, the woman transferred him 200 yuan by phone but was later criticized for paying too little when she shared her story online. On April 6, she committed suicide. Her parents and other online commentators called for the people who bullied her to be sued or punished.

On April 12, Hongkou District Health Department IT lead Qian Wenxiong killed himself, leaving behind his cancer-ridden wife. Many Chinese netizens believe his suicide was due to the stress under the zero-COVID policy. (Previous rumors inaccurately attributed the death either to Qian's wife or to another official named Cai Yongqiang and were "dispelled" by official sources.)

On April 26, a French citizen is seen on a two-minute-long video asking quarantine workers for help with suicide in three languages. He was subdued and later became stabilized. The French embassy confirmed his identity and commented that food shortage is likely not the reason.

Pet killing 
On April 6, a community guard beat a Corgi to death after refusing a request to allow the dog to be taken with the owner into isolation. Later, the local community stated that they were worried that the dog may have been infected but acknowledged that they didn't "think very carefully" and would compensate the owner.

On April 7, the infected owner of a cat called the CDC about bringing their cat to quarantine. The CDC bluntly responded that the "only thing they could do was to wait to be taken away and to give up on their cat".

On May 9, live fish were recorded getting killed by ground impact at the entrance to a residential complex in Jingan. The local residents' committee explained that the group-buy organizer acquired permission for buying refrigerated fish, not the prohibited live fish actually delivered. The organizer chose to kill the fish outside the gate to comply.

Forced quarantine
According to a 19-minute recording, a woman and her husband were forced to go to a mobile cabin hospital, even though none of their family members were positive for COVID-19. They consented to leaving if tested positive, but policies had forced them to leave home because officials already believed they were positive for COVID-19. Shanghai officials replied saying that person in question was a 13-year-old girl, and they had already communicated with the family many times previously. and they had agreed at first, but this time they disagreed; according to the policy, they need to take them to a mobile cabin hospital. Officials also said that the results from the "Health Cloud" app may differ from the actual situation.

Child separation 
A system for quarantining children, including infants, away from adults was implemented. The site in Jinshan was first reported online by desperate parents. The separation was described officially on April 2 as a policy to "quickly help" minors and involves "temporary guardians". On April 4, the health committee said that a system is in place to allow some children to be accompanied by their also COVID-positive parents. An online trend started where parents sought to become infected to stay with their children.

This system was described as a "humanitarian crisis" by a Radio France Internationale commentator. On March 31, the Consulate of France in Shanghai issued a protest to the Shanghai Government on behalf of 24 EU states.

Legality 
In early May, constitutional academic  expressed his opposition to forced quarantine transport and home disinfection, stating that the authorities' legal basis (Public Security Penalties Law, Art. 50(1)) is nil – the law requires a state of emergency to be declared, but none has been. Around the same time, financial lawyer Liu Dali expressed his opposition to procedural problems in quarantine transport, namely lack of paperwork and an overly liberal definition of "contact" involving whole floors or even buildings. Both articles were quickly taken down on the Chinese internet, their Weibo accounts suspended, and bar associations warned not to distribute these articles.

See also 
 COVID-19 pandemic in Shanghai

Notes

References

External links 

 The Sounds of April: 
 The Dead of Shanghai:
 Backup of original, by China Digital Times
 Crowd-sourced continuation on Airtable

Shanghai
Health in Shanghai
21st century in Shanghai
February 2022 events in China
March 2022 events in China
April 2022 events in China
Containment efforts related to the COVID-19 pandemic
Disease outbreaks in China

fr:Pandémie de Covid-19 en Chine#Recrudescence en 2022 avec le variant Omicron